Toll Gate or Tollgate may refer to:

 Toll gate, a barrier across a toll road or toll bridge that is lifted when the toll is paid

Entertainment
 "Tollgate" (Hale single)
 The Toll-Gate, a 1954 novel by Georgette Heyer
 The Toll Gate, a 1920 American silent Western film

Places
 Tollgate, Ontario, Canada
 Tollgate, Chennai, India
 Toll Gate, Alabama, U.S.
 Tollgate, Oregon, U.S.
 Toll Gate, West Virginia, U.S.

See also
 Toll Gate Heights, Indiana
 
 Toll (disambiguation)
 The Toll (disambiguation)
 Toll house (disambiguation)